Henan is a central province of China, known for an unusual way of playing the guzheng; the technique, known as you yao, consistings of using the right hand to pluck the strings, starting from the movable bridge to the fixed bridge, while using the left hand to press the strings at the other end, creating a rich and dramatic sound effect.  Guzheng music evolved over time to what is now known as Qu opera.

Henan's folk heritage includes ballads and is characterized by large position changes and gliding vibrato.  A popular form of narrative singing, which is accompanied by a bowed lute called zhuihu, is called zhuizi.

Henan
Culture in Henan